Bhadohi is a city in the Indian state of Uttar Pradesh. It is home to the largest hand-knotted carpet weaving industry hub in South Asia. The city is 45 km west of Varanasi and 82 km east of Allahabad.

Demographics 

As of 2011 Indian Census, Bhadohi had a total population of 94,620, of which 49,639 were males and 44,981 were females. Population within the age group of 0 to 6 years was 14,083. The total number of literates in Bhadohi was 58,470, which constituted 61.8% of the population with male literacy of 68.0% and female literacy of 54.9%. The effective literacy rate of 7+ population of Bhadohi was 72.6%, of which male literacy rate was 79.8% and female literacy rate was 64.6%. The Scheduled Castes and Scheduled Tribes population was 9,597 and 15 respectively. Bhadohi had 13274 households in 2011.

Commerce
The main business in Bhadohi is carpet manufacturing. Bhadohi employs 22 lakh artisans in its carpet industry.

Education
Indian Institute of Carpet Technology, the only institute of its kind in Asia, was established by Ministry of Textiles, Government of India in 2001. It has been recognized by All India Council for Technical Education and is affiliated with Joint Seat Allocation Authority (JOSAA).The institute offers a Bachelor of Technology (B.Tech) in Carpet and Textile Technology (CTT). The syllabus of the programmes covers both practical as well as theoretical understanding of the process of dyeing, textile fibres, carpet washing, and other industrial techniques.

References

External links 
 

Cities and towns in Bhadohi district
Industrial cities and towns in Uttar Pradesh
Bhadohi